Lin Chia-sheng (born 12 July 1980 in Tainan) is a Taiwanese football player. He has played for Taipei City Bank F.C. in Taiwan.

Biography

Early years
Lin began to play football at the age of nine when he studied in Sheng Li Elementary School in his home town Tainan. He later entered the football team of Guei Ren Junior High School and National Hsin-Feng Senior High School and started to play in the National First Division Football League with Taipei City Bank F.C. when he was 17. In 1998, he was enrolled into Ming Chuan University and assisted its football team to win the champion of National College Cup.

However, 2000 was a miserable year for Lin. His mother loved football, and she used to drive to Tai-chung to watch the national hsin feng senior high football team play. Unfortunately she had an accident when traveling back to Chia-yi (嘉義) and injured her spine. As a result, Lin gave up his participation in the school football team and commuted between Taipei and Tainan every week to take care of his mother.

Move to England
After serving the military service, Lin determined to develop his career overseas. He joined the reserve team of Hayes in 2004, and then he contracted with the reserve team of Bolton Wanderers in January 2005. He was the first Taiwanese footballer joining European football club.

MLS tryouts
In the early 2007, Lin tried to move to the Major League Soccer of the United States due to lack of opportunities in England. Being one of the 900 participants competing in Los Angeles Galaxy's open tryouts, he was included in the final 24 but left out by the coaching staff eventually. Lin also challenged to Chivas USA, but he was not able to make the semifinals. In 2008 and 2009, Lin made several attempts in LA Galaxy's open tryouts but did not succeed. On 8 March, it was announced that Lin will go on another trial with LA Galaxy.

Tainan Football Camp
In Tainan, Lin founded the Tainan Football Camp (literally Sunshine Lohas Football Camp) which is sponsored by Spirox Education Foundationand Chi Mei Corporation. He and his brother provide football trainings to the local children.

References

External links
 Lin Chia-sheng's personal blog 
 Tainan Football Camp 

1980 births
Living people
Taiwanese footballers
Taiwanese men's futsal players
Footballers from Tainan
Taiwanese expatriate footballers
Expatriate footballers in England
Taiwanese expatriate sportspeople in the United Kingdom
Chinese Taipei international footballers
Association football midfielders